A utility vehicle is a vehicle, generally motorized, that is designed to carry out a specific task with more efficacy than a passenger vehicle. It sometimes refers to a small truck with low sides.

Types of utility vehicles

Military light utility vehicle

Military light utility vehicle, or simply light utility vehicle, (LUV), is a term used for the lightest weight class military vehicle category.[1] A Jeep-like four-wheel drive vehicle for military use[2] by definition lighter than other military trucks and vehicles, inherently compact and usually with light or no armour, with short body overhangs for nimble all-terrain mobility, and frequently around 4-passenger capacity.

Armored utility vehicle
The military also use armored utility vehicles.

Sport utility vehicle (SUV)

Traditionally, these are vehicles similar to a station wagon, but built on a light-truck chassis and equipped with four-wheel drive or all-wheel drive amongst other off-road hardware. Their primary purpose is to display superior off-road and towing capabilities, with higher seating capacity.

Multi utility vehicle
These are larger vehicles which can tackle a wide range of applications. They typically allow easy conversion between multiple combinations of passenger and luggage capacity.

Crossover utility vehicle

Station wagons based on a car chassis, but built to resemble sport utility vehicles. They have limited off-road capability but sportier on-road behavior than SUVs. May also be referred to as a "Sports Activity Vehicle", as is the case with BMW's X-range of vehicles.

Light equipment 

Vehicles like the Kawasaki MULE in which a flat bed is added to an all terrain vehicle.  Generally used as a maintenance vehicle.

A jeep is a type of light utility vehicle, originally used by the US military, with four-wheel drive for travelling over rough terrain.

Coupé utility or tray utility vehicle 

Vehicles featuring a coupé passenger compartment with an attached cargo bed. All-steel-bodied utility vehicles, more commonly called utes, were introduced in Australia.

Sports utility truck or vehicle(SUV), utility truck or pickup truck 

Utility trucks, (known as pickup trucks in the US) are similar to Coupé utilities. The main difference being that they are either built specifically for purpose or based upon Sports utility vehicles rather than being produced by modifying existing passenger vehicles. They combine elements of road-going passenger cars with features from off-road vehicles, such as raised ground clearance and four-wheel drive.

Utility task vehicle 

The Side-by-side (SxS), also known as utility task vehicle (UTV), is small four-wheel off-road vehicle. It has a side-by-side seating arrangement, and UTVs often have seat belts, roll-over protection and a storage box at the rear of the vehicle.

In 2017, the UTV category was added to the Rally Dakar.

See also

References

Vehicles by purpose